Munich-Untermenzing station is a railway station in the Allach-Untermenzing borough of Munich, Germany.

References

Munich S-Bahn stations
Untermenzing
Railway stations in Germany opened in 2005